Arkum at  is a part of Silifke district which itself is a part of Mersin Province, Turkey. It is in the alluvial plain at the east of Göksu River. Towns Atakent and Atayurt are to the north and Silifke is to the west. The population of the town is 2000. as of 2012

References

Populated places in Mersin Province
Towns in Turkey
Populated places in Silifke District
Populated coastal places in Turkey